Ismail Kamara (born 14 February 1997) is a Sierra Leonean sprinter. He competed at the 2016 Summer Olympics in the 100 metres race; his time of 10.95 seconds in the preliminary round did not qualify him for the first round.

References

1997 births
Living people
Sierra Leonean male sprinters
Olympic athletes of Sierra Leone
Athletes (track and field) at the 2016 Summer Olympics